No.l.ita is an Italian fashion designer.  In 2007, the company generated a storm of controversy for their "No.Anorexia" ad campaign featuring emaciated model Isabelle Caro.

References

External links
Official Web site

Clothing companies of Italy